Hemihedrite is a rare lead zinc chromate silicate mineral with formula Pb10Zn(CrO4)6(SiO4)2(F,OH)2. It forms a series with the copper analogue iranite.

Discovery and occurrence
Hemihedrite was first described in 1967 for occurrences in the Florence lead silver mine in the Ripsey District, Tortilla Mountains, Pinal County, Arizona, US. It was named for the hemihedral morphology of its crystals.

It occurs in oxidized veins containing galena, sphalerite and pyrite. Associated secondary minerals include cerussite, phoenicochroite, vauquelinite, willemite, wulfenite, galena, sphalerite, pyrite, tennantite and chalcopyrite. It has been reported from several mining districts in Arizona and one in Nevada. It has also been reported from the Antofagasta Region of Chile and the Anarak District of Esfahan Province, Iran.

References

Chromate minerals
Triclinic minerals
Lead minerals
Zinc minerals
Minerals in space group 2
Minerals described in 1967